Howard Barraclough Fell (June 6, 1917 – April 21, 1994), better known as Barry Fell, was a professor of invertebrate zoology at the Harvard Museum of Comparative Zoology. While his primary professional research included starfish and sea urchins,  Fell is best known for his pseudoarchaeological work in New World epigraphy, arguing that various inscriptions in the Americas are best explained by extensive pre-Columbian contact with Old World civilizations. His writings on epigraphy and archaeology are generally rejected by those mainstream scholars who have considered them.

Biography
Fell was born in Lewes, Sussex, England, and was a grandson of the railway engineer and inventor John Barraclough Fell.  He moved with his mother to New Zealand in the early 1920s after his father, who was a merchant seaman, died in a shipboard fire.

He returned to the British Isles for graduate work, receiving his Ph.D. at the University of Edinburgh in 1941. Fell then served with the British Army during World War II. In 1946 he returned to New Zealand, where he resumed his academic career, and lectured in zoology at Victoria University of Wellington.

A world authority on fossil sea urchins, he supervised a number of students including Helen E.S. Clark and they published a number of studies on Antarctic seastars. He was recruited by Harvard University in 1964, and emigrated to the United States to join the staff of the Museum of Comparative Zoology at Harvard where he worked until retirement in 1979.

He died of heart failure in San Diego, California, aged 77, while discussing a new book with his publisher.

Epigraphy
Although Fell was an accomplished marine biologist at Harvard University, he is best known for three books which claim that many centuries before Christopher Columbus reached America, Celts, Basques, Phoenicians, Egyptians, and others were visiting North America.

His interest in inscriptions began early in his career with a study of Polynesian petroglyphs published in 1940, but his most famous work came much later, starting in 1976 with his publication of America B.C., in which he proposed translations of inscriptions found on rock surfaces and artifacts in North and South America which he believed to be written in Old World scripts and languages. He followed up this work in 1980 with Saga America and in 1982 with Bronze Age America.

Fell's epigraphic work was not well received in academia. Critics of Fell's work routinely dismissed him as an amateur, pointing out his lack of formal training in ancient scripts and languages.

A scholarly response to Fell's work was prepared by Ives Goddard and William W. Fitzhugh of the Department of Anthropology at the Smithsonian Institution.  They stated, in 1978, that "the arguments of America B.C. are unconvincing.  The only accepted case of pre-Columbian European contact in North America remains the Norse site of L'Anse aux Meadows in northern Newfoundland.  Perhaps some day credible proof of other early European contacts will be discovered in the New World. However, America B.C. does not contain such proof and does not employ the standard linguistic and archeological methods that would be necessary to convince specialists in these fields."

One example of Fell's claims is his contention in Saga America that Brendan of Clonfert may have reached North America centuries before Columbus. This is based on Fell's translation, published in the magazine Wonderful West Virginia in 1983, of two rock-cut inscriptions located at archaeological sites in Wyoming and Boone counties, West Virginia. According to Fell, these inscriptions narrate the story of Christ's nativity and are written in an old Irish script called Ogham, dating back to the 6th or 8th century AD. This led to the publication of articles in the journal The West Virginia Archeologist that were highly critical of Fell's conclusions and methodology, including a 1983 article by archaeologist and historian W. Hunter Lesser describing Fell's claims as pseudoscientific and unreliable. In 1989 lawyers Monroe Oppenheimer and Willard Wirtz wrote an article based on opinions of academic archaeologists and linguists to dispute that the inscription is written in Ogham script. They further accused Fell of deliberate fraud.

David H. Kelley, an archaeologist at the University of Calgary who is credited with a major breakthrough in the decipherment of Mayan glyphs, complained about Fell in a 1990 essay: "Fell's work [contains] major academic sins, the three worst being distortion of data, inadequate acknowledgment of predecessors, and lack of presentation of alternative views." In the same essay, however, Kelley went on to state that "I have no personal doubts that some of the inscriptions which have been reported are genuine Celtic ogham." Kelley concluded: "Despite my occasional harsh criticism of Fell's treatment of individual inscriptions, it should be recognized that without Fell's work there would be no [North American] ogham problem to perplex us. We need to ask not only what Fell has done wrong in his epigraphy, but also where we have gone wrong as archaeologists in not recognizing such an extensive European presence in the New World."

Archaeology survey

A survey of 340 teaching archaeologists in 1983, showed 95.7% had a "negative" view of Barry Fell's claims (considering them pseudo-archaeology),  2.9%  had a "neutral" view, and only 1.4% (5) had a "positive" view (regarding them as factual).

See also 
 America's Stonehenge
 Bourne stone
 Burrows Cave
 Institute for the Study of American Cultures
 Los Lunas Decalogue Stone
 Mi'kmaq hieroglyphic writing
 Pre-Columbian trans-oceanic contact
 Pseudoarchaeology
 Turkey Mountain inscriptions

References
Notes

Bibliography

External links 
 Is Carrier Celtic? - Yinka Déné Language Institute article critical of Fell's ideas
 Epigraphic Society website
 Midwestern Epigraphic Society website
 New England Antiquities Research Association website
 Equinox Project page in honor of Fell
 Language on the fringe, Mark Newbrook, Skeptical Adversaria, Spring 2011, page 10.

20th-century New Zealand zoologists
Epigraphers
1917 births
1994 deaths
Pseudoarchaeologists
Pseudohistorians
Pre-Columbian trans-oceanic contact
Harvard University faculty
Academic staff of the Victoria University of Wellington
Hyperdiffusionism
People from Lewes
British Army personnel of World War II
20th-century American zoologists